Sharp  or SHARP may refer to:

Acronyms
 SHARP (helmet ratings) (Safety Helmet Assessment and Rating Programme), a British motorcycle helmet safety rating scheme
 Self Help Addiction Recovery Program, a charitable organisation founded in 1991 by Barbara Bach and Pattie Boyd
 Sexual Harassment/Assault Response & Prevention, a US Army program dealing with sexual harassment
 Skinheads Against Racial Prejudice, an anti-racist Trojan skinhead organization formed to combat White power skinheads
 Society for the History of Authorship, Reading and Publishing
 Stationary High Altitude Relay Platform, a 1980s beamed-power aircraft
 Super High Altitude Research Project, a 1990s project to develop a high-velocity gun

Companies
 I. P. Sharp Associates, a former Canadian computer services company
 Sharp Airlines, an Australian regional airline
 Sharp Corporation, a Japanese electronics manufacturer
 Sharp Entertainment, an American TV program producer
 Sharp HealthCare, a hospital system in San Diego, California
 Sharp Memorial Hospital, San Diego
 Sharp Chula Vista Medical Center, Chula Vista, California
 Sharp Solar, a manufacturer of photovoltaic cells and films

Music
 Sharp (music), a musical notation sign
 Sharp (band), English band featuring ex-Jam members
 Sharp (South Korean band), pop music group
 The Sharp, Australian pop/rock band
 Sharp (Angela Winbush album)
 Sharp (Etnica album), 2004

People and fictional characters
 Sharp (surname), a list of people and fictional characters
 Sharp Delany (c. 1739–1799), American Revolutionary War colonel and member of the legislature of Pennsylvania
 Sharp Räsänen (born 1999), Finnish footballer
 Sharp, e.g. card sharp, a swindler at games of chance and skill

Places and geographical features

Antarctica
 Sharp Glacier, Graham Land
 Sharp Peak, Livingston Island, South Shetland Islands, a hill
 Sharp Valley, on James Ross Island, Antarctic Peninsula
 Mount Sharp (Antarctica), Sentinel Range, West Antarctica

United States
 Sharp, Missouri, an unincorporated community
 Sharp County, Arkansas
 Sharp Burial Ground, Kingston, New York
 Sharp Mountain, Pennsylvania, a ridgeline

Outer space
 Sharp (crater), a crater on the moon
 Mount Sharp, a small mountain on Mars
 5426 Sharp, an asteroid

Other places
 Sharp Glacier (Greenland)
 Sharp Island, Hong Kong
 Sharp Island (Ontario), Georgian Bay, Canada
 Sharp Peak, a hill in Hong Kong

Publications
 Sharp (magazine), a Canadian magazine
 Sharp Daily, a free newspaper published in Taiwan and Hong Kong

Titles
 Eric Sharp, Baron Sharp of Grimsdyke (1916–1994)
 Evelyn Sharp, Baroness Sharp (1903–1985), British civil servant
 Margaret Sharp, Baroness Sharp of Guildford (born 1938)
 Sharp baronets, three titles, one in the Baronetage of Nova Scotia and two in the Baronetage of the United Kingdom

Other uses
 Sharp (automobile)
 Sharp (flour), a flour made from hard wheat
 Sharp (science), also called a hypodermic needle
 Sharp (set theory)
 Sharp (TV series)
 Sharp Gymnasium, a multi-purpose arena in Houston, Texas, United States,  home to the Houston Baptist University Huskies basketball and volleyball teams
 Sharp Scale, a measure of paper opacity
 Sharp, a type of sewing needle 
 Sharp, a mathematics term often applied to upper and lower bounds; see Mathematical jargon

See also
 Helgi the Sharp (Ringerike), a figure in Norse mythology
 Helgi the Sharp (Zealand), a figure in Norse mythology
 Sharp House (disambiguation)
 Sharp Resolution, a 1617 resolution taken by the States of Holland and West Friesland
 Sharp v. Murphy, a US Supreme Court case decided in 2020
 Sharpe (disambiguation)
 Sharps (disambiguation)